Vipin Dhaka (born 4 September 1996) is an Indian cricketer. He made his List A debut on 27 February 2021, for Arunachal Pradesh in the 2020–21 Vijay Hazare Trophy. He made his Twenty20 debut on 4 November 2021, for Arunachal Pradesh in the 2021–22 Syed Mushtaq Ali Trophy. He made his Ranji Trophy debug on 27 December 2022, for Arunachal Pradesh.

References

External links
 

1996 births
Living people
Indian cricketers
Arunachal Pradesh cricketers
Place of birth missing (living people)